Odd Fellows Cemetery is a cemetery in the Boyle Heights neighborhood of Los Angeles, California.

Fetus burial

In 1985, 16,433 aborted fetuses were buried in unmarked graves at the cemetery on donated land. The fetuses were found in a shipping container in Woodland Hills, California in February 1982, and a three-year dispute over their burial ensued. The dispute reached the Supreme Court, who ruled the remains must be buried in a nonreligious ceremony. The burial included a eulogy by President Ronald Reagan, which was read at the 7 October 1985 service by Michael D. Antonovich.

Notable interments
William W. Fraser (died 1915) received the Medal of Honor for gallantry during the Siege of Vicksburg on 22 May 1863.
Dr Harry Lehrer (died 1972) owned the Bumiller Building in Los Angeles.
Billy Gilbert (died 1971) was a comedian and actor.
Chris-Pin Martin (died 1953) was an American actor.

References

External links
 
 Eastside 101: Odd Fellows Cemetery

Cemeteries in Los Angeles
Boyle Heights, Los Angeles
Odd Fellows cemeteries in the United States